Bethlehem Historic District may refer to:

in the United States
(by state)
Bethlehem Green Historic District, Bethlehem, Connecticut
Bethlehem Historic District (Augusta, Georgia)
Bethlehem Academy Historic District, St. John, Kentucky 
Bethlehem Loading Company Mays Landing Plant Archeological Historic District, Estell Manor, New Jersey
Central Bethlehem Historic District, Bethlehem, Pennsylvania
South Bethlehem Downtown Historic District, Bethlehem, Pennsylvania
Bethlehem Middle Works Historic District, Christiansted, Virgin Islands